Engina itzamnai is a species of sea snail, a marine gastropod mollusc in the family Pisaniidae.

Description

Distribution
This marine species occurs of Quintana Roo, Yucatán, Mexico.

References

 Petuch E. (2013) Biogeography and biodiversity of western Atlantic mollusks. CRC Press. 252 pp
 Watters G.T. & Fraussen K. (2015). A revision of the western Atlantic Ocean genus Engina with notes on Hesperisternia (Gastropoda: Buccinidae: Pisaniinae). The Nautilus. 129(3): 95-117

External links
 Watters, G. T. (2009). A revision of the western Atlantic Ocean genera Anna, Antillophos, Bailya, Caducifer, Monostiolum, and Parviphos, with description of a new genus, Dianthiphos, and notes on Engina and Hesperisternia Gastropoda: Buccinidae: Pisaniinae) and Cumia (Colubrariidae). The Nautilus. 123(4): 225-275

Pisaniidae
Gastropods described in 2009